Bussell may refer to:
 Bussell (surname), a surname (including a list of people with the name)
 Bussell Highway, a road in Western Australia
 Bussell Island, an island in Tennessee of archaeological importance